Monkey Island is a peninsula on the northern shore of Grand Lake o' the Cherokees, located  southwest of Grove, Oklahoma.

References

Landforms of Oklahoma
Landforms of Delaware County, Oklahoma
Peninsulas of Oklahoma